The following outline is provided as an overview of and topical guide to Cuba:

Cuba – island country in the Caribbean. The nation of Cuba consists of the main island of Cuba, the Isla de la Juventud, and several archipelagos. Havana is the largest city in Cuba and the country's capital. Santiago de Cuba is the second largest city. Cuba is home to over 11 million people and is the most populous island nation in the Caribbean. Its people, culture, and customs draw from diverse sources, such as the aboriginal Taíno and Ciboney peoples, the period of Spanish colonialism, the introduction of African slaves and its proximity to the United States.

General reference

 Pronounced:  , 
 Common English country name:  Cuba
 Official English country name:  The Republic of Cuba
 Common endonym(s):  
 Official endonym(s): República de Cuba
 Adjectival(s): Cuban
 Demonym(s):`cubano/cubana
 Etymology: Name of Cuba
 International rankings of Cuba
 ISO country codes:  CU, CUB, 192
 ISO region codes:  See ISO 3166-2:CU
 Internet country code top-level domain:  .cu

Geography of Cuba 

Geography of Cuba
 Cuba is an island country
 Cuba is located in the following regions:
 Northern Hemisphere and Western Hemisphere
 North America (though not on the mainland)
 Atlantic Ocean
 North Atlantic
 Caribbean
 Antilles
 Greater Antilles
 Time zone:  UTC-05, summer UTC-04
 Extreme points of Cuba
 High:  Pico Turquino 
 Low:  Caribbean Sea 0 m
 Coastline:  3,735 km
 Population: 11,268,000  - 73rd most populous country
 Area: 110,861 km2
 Atlas of Cuba

Environment of Cuba 

 Ecoregions
 Biosphere reserves
 Earthquakes in Cuba
 Wildlife of Cuba
 Flora
 Fauna of Cuba
 Birds
 Mammals
 Amphibians and reptiles

Natural geographic features 

 Islands
 Mountains
 Bodies of water
 Gulfs and bays
 Bay of Cárdenas
 Bay of Havana
 Bay of Matanzas
 Bay of Pigs
 Bay of Santa Clara
 Ensenada de la Broa
 Guantánamo Bay, Cuba
 Gulf of Batabanó
 Gulf of Cazones
 Gulf of Guacanayabo
 Rivers
 List of World Heritage Sites

Regions of Cuba 

List of places in Cuba

Ecoregions of Cuba 

List of ecoregions in Cuba

Administrative divisions of Cuba 

Administrative divisions of Cuba

Provinces of Cuba 

Provinces of Cuba
 Camagüey Province
 Capital: Camagüey
 Ciego de Ávila Province
 Capital: Ciego de Ávila
 Cienfuegos Province
 Capital: Cienfuegos
 Granma
 Capital: Bayamo
 Guantánamo Province
 Capital: Guantánamo
 Ciudad de La Habana (Havana)
 La Habana Province
 Capital: no provincial capital, as the country's capital is located here
 Holguín Province
 Capital: Holguín
 Matanzas Province
 Capital: Matanzas
 Pinar del Río Province
 Capital: Pinar del Río
 Sancti Spíritus Province
 Capital: Sancti Spíritus
 Santiago de Cuba Province
 Capital: Santiago de Cuba
 Las Tunas Province
 Capital: Victoria de Las Tunas
 Villa Clara Province
 Capital: Santa Clara

Municipalities of Cuba 

Municipalities of Cuba
 Capital of Cuba: Havana
 Cities of Cuba

Demography of Cuba 

Demographics of Cuba

History of Cuba 

History of Cuba
Timeline of the history of Cuba

By period 
 Chronology of Colonial Cuba1512–1898
 Liberation from Spain
 Ten Years' War1868–1868
 Little War (Cuba)Aug.1879–Sept. 1880
 Cuban War of Independence1895–1898
 Sinking of USS MaineFebruary 1898
 Spanish–American WarApr. 1898–Aug. 1898
 First Occupation of Cuba1898–1902
 Republic of Cuba (1902–1959)
 Cuban–American Treaty of Relations (1903)
 Second Occupation of Cuba, by the United States1906–1909
 Negro Rebellion1912
 Sugar Intervention1917–1922
 March 1923
 creation of the Cuban Communist Party1925
 Sergeants' RevoltSeptember 1933
 One Hundred Days GovernmentSept. 1933–Jan. 1934
 Cuban–American Treaty of Relations (1934)June 1934
 Cuban Revolution1953–1959
 Timeline of the Cuban Revolution
 Fidel Castro in the Cuban Revolution
 Moncada Barracksattack on 26 July 1953
 26th of July Movement19539
 Granma (yacht)November 1956
 Cuba – Soviet relations
 Republic of Cuba1959–
 Escambray rebellion1959–1965
 Bay of Pigs InvasionApril 1961
 Cuban Missile CrisisOctober 1962
 Cuban intervention in Angola1975–1991)
 Special Period in Time of Peaceeconomic crisis, 1991–2000
 August 1994 protest in Cuba
 Cuban thaw2014–

By region 
 History of Cuba's provinces
 History of Granma Province
 History of Guantánamo Province
 History of Havana
 History of Holguín Province
 History of Pinar del Río Province
 History of Sancti Spíritus Province
 History of Santiago de Cuba Province
 History of Villa Clara Province

By subject 
 Anarchism in Cuba
 Economic history of Cuba
 Dollar store
 Cuban sugar economy
 Military history of Cuba
 History of Cuban Nationality

Government and politics of Cuba 

Politics of Cuba
 Form of government: socialist state, with national parliament
 Capital of Cuba: Havana
 Corruption in Cuba
 Cuban exile
 Elections in Cuba
 Political movements in Cuba
 Cuban dissident movement
 Liberalism in Cuba
 Political parties in Cuba
 Governing political party: Communist Party of Cuba

Branches of the government of Cuba 

Government of Cuba

Executive branch of the government of Cuba 
 Head of state and head of government: President of Cuba, Raúl Castro
 Cabinet of Cuba: Council of Ministers of Cuba
 Ministry of Foreign Affairs
 Council of State of Cuba

Legislative branch of the government of Cuba 

 National Assembly of People's Power

Judicial branch of the government of Cuba 

Cuban legal system
 Supreme Court of Cuba
 Legal profession in Cuba

Foreign relations of Cuba 

Foreign relations of Cuba
 International Committee for Democracy in Cuba
 Diplomatic missions (embassies)
 Diplomatic missions in Cuba
 Diplomatic missions of Cuba
 Foreign relations, by country
 Cuba–Russia relations
 People's Republic of China – Cuba relations
 United States-Cuba relations
 CIA activities in Cuba
 Cuba – United States Maritime Boundary Agreement
 Cuban migration to Miami
 United States citizens granted political asylum in Cuba
 United States embargo against Cuba
 Cuban medical internationalism

International organization membership 
The Republic of Cuba is a member of:

African, Caribbean, and Pacific Group of States (ACP)
Agency for the Prohibition of Nuclear Weapons in Latin America and the Caribbean (OPANAL)
Food and Agriculture Organization (FAO)
Group of 77 (G77)
International Atomic Energy Agency (IAEA)
International Chamber of Commerce (ICC)
International Civil Aviation Organization (ICAO)
International Criminal Police Organization (Interpol)
International Federation of Red Cross and Red Crescent Societies (IFRCS)
International Fund for Agricultural Development (IFAD)
International Hydrographic Organization (IHO)
International Labour Organization (ILO)
International Maritime Organization (IMO)
International Mobile Satellite Organization (IMSO)
International Olympic Committee (IOC)
International Organization for Migration (IOM) (observer)
International Organization for Standardization (ISO)
International Red Cross and Red Crescent Movement (ICRM)
International Telecommunication Union (ITU)
International Telecommunications Satellite Organization (ITSO)
Inter-Parliamentary Union (IPU)

Latin American Economic System (LAES)
Latin American Integration Association (LAIA)
Nonaligned Movement (NAM)
Organisation for the Prohibition of Chemical Weapons (OPCW)
Organization of American States (OAS) (sanctioned since 1962)
Permanent Court of Arbitration (PCA)
Unión Latina
United Nations (UN)
United Nations Conference on Trade and Development (UNCTAD)
United Nations Educational, Scientific, and Cultural Organization (UNESCO)
United Nations Industrial Development Organization (UNIDO)
United Nations Institute for Training and Research (UNITAR)
Universal Postal Union (UPU)
World Confederation of Labour (WCL)
World Customs Organization (WCO)
World Federation of Trade Unions (WFTU)
World Health Organization (WHO)
World Intellectual Property Organization (WIPO)
World Meteorological Organization (WMO)
World Tourism Organization (UNWTO)
World Trade Organization (WTO)

Law and order in Cuba 
 

 Capital punishment in Cuba
 Constitution of Cuba
 Crime in Cuba
 Human rights in Cuba
 Censorship in Cuba
 LGBT rights in Cuba
 Recognition of same-sex unions in Cuba
 Freedom of religion in Cuba
 Law enforcement in Cuba

Military of Cuba 

Military of Cuba
 Command
 Commander-in-chief:
 Ministry of Defence of Cuba
 Forces
 Army of Cuba
 Navy of Cuba
 Air Force of Cuba
 Special forces of Cuba
 Military history of Cuba
 Military ranks of Cuba

Local government in Cuba 

Local government in Cuba

Culture of Cuba 

Culture of Cuba
 Architecture of Cuba
 Forts in Cuba
 Castillo de Jagua
 Castillo de San Pedro de la Roca
 Castillo de la Real Fuerza
 La Cabaña
 Morro Castle
 San Salvador de la Punta Fortress
 Cuisine of Cuba
 Cuba Libre
 Cuban sandwich
 Festivals in Cuba
 Languages of Cuba
 Media in Cuba
 Museums in Cuba
 National symbols of Cuba
 Coat of arms of Cuba
 Flag of Cuba
 National anthem of Cuba
 People of Cuba
 Ethnic minorities in Cuba
 Chinese Cubans
 Afro-Cubans
 Jewbans
 Women in Cuba
 Prostitution in Cuba
 Public holidays in Cuba
 Racism in Cuba
 Records of Cuba
 Scouting and Guiding in Cuba
 World Heritage Sites in Cuba

Art in Cuba 
 Art in Cuba
 List of Cuban artists
 Cinema of Cuba
 List of Cuban films
 Dance in Cuba
 Cuban National Ballet
 Literature of Cuba
 List of Cuban writers
 Music of Cuba
 Cuban folk music
 Cuban jazz
 Cuban rock
 Early Cuban bands
 National Symphony Orchestra of Cuba
 Television in Cuba
 Theatre in Cuba
 Cuban musical theatre
 National Theater of Cuba

Religion in Cuba 

Religion in Cuba
 Christianity in Cuba
 Episcopal Church of Cuba
 Protestantism in Cuba
 Roman Catholicism in Cuba
 Hinduism in Cuba
 Islam in Cuba
 Judaism in Cuba

Sports in Cuba 

Sport in Cuba

In general 
 Cuba at the Olympics
 Cuban Olympic Committee
 List of Olympic medalists for Cuba
 Cuban athletes
 Cuban records in athletics
 Cuba at the Pan American Games

By sport 
 Baseball in Cuba
 Cuban national baseball system
 Basketball in Cuba
 Cuba national basketball team
 Cuba women's national basketball team
 Cricket in Cuba
 Cuba national cricket team
 Football in Cuba
 Asociación de Fútbol de Cuba
 Cuba national football team
 Handball in Cuba
 Cuba men's national handball team
 Rugby in Cuba
 Rugby union in Cuba
 Volleyball in Cuba
 Cuba men's national volleyball team
 Cuba women's national volleyball team

Economy and infrastructure of Cuba 

Economy of Cuba
 Economic rank, by nominal GDP (2007): 68th (sixty-eighth)
 Agriculture in Cuba
 Agricultural cooperatives
 CPA (Cooperativa de Producción Agropecuaria)
 UBPC - 'Unidad Básica de Producción Cooperativa', or Basic Unit of Cooperative Production
 Banking in Cuba
 Central Bank of Cuba
 List of banks in Cuba
 Companies of Cuba
 Currency of Cuba: Convertible Peso / Peso
ISO 4217: CUP
 Economic history of Cuba
 Energy in Cuba
 Energy policy of Cuba
 Oil industry in Cuba
 Mining in Cuba
 Oil reserves in Cuba
 Rationing in Cuba
 Cuba Stock Exchange
 Tourism in Cuba
 Water supply and sanitation in Cuba
 Water privatization in Cuba

Communications in Cuba 

Communications in Cuba
 Internet in Cuba
 Cuba Emergency Response System
 Internet in Cuba
 Newspapers in Cuba
 Telephone numbers in Cuba
 Television in Cuba

Transportation in Cuba 

Transportation in Cuba
 Airports in Cuba
 Rail transport in Cuba
 Ferrocarriles de Cuba
 Road transport in Cuba
 Roads in Cuba
 Carretera Central
 Vehicle registration plates of Cuba

Education in Cuba 

Education in Cuba
 Universities in Cuba

Health in Cuba 

 Health care in Cuba
 Hospitals in Cuba

See also

Cuba

Index of Cuba-related articles
List of international rankings
Member state of the United Nations
Outline of geography
Outline of North America

References

External links

 BBC: Cuba: Key Facts
 Granma — International edition of Communist Party of Cuba Newspaper
 Cuba Web Directory — Links directory on Cuba.
 Government of Cuba
 Cuban News Agency
 
 Cuba. The World Factbook. Central Intelligence Agency.
 The Cuban Rafter Phenomenon: A Unique Sea Exodus  — University of Miami site

Cuba